Caenurgina crassiuscula, the clover looper or range grass moth, is a moth of the family Erebidae. The species was first described by Adrian Hardy Haworth in 1809. It is found from coast to coast in the United States and adjacent parts of Canada, in the west to the Northwest Territories, Yukon, and Alaska.

The wingspan is 30–40 mm. Adults are on wing from March to November depending on the location.

The larvae feed on various species of clover, grass, and lupine.

References

External links

 List establishing Caenurgina distincta as a synonym

Moths of North America
Moths described in 1809
Caenurgina